The Miners Strike of 1910-11 was an attempt by miners and their families to improve wages and living conditions in severely deprived parts of South Wales, where wages had been kept deliberately low for many years by a cartel of mine owners.

What became known as the Tonypandy riots of 1910 and 1911 (sometimes collectively known as the Rhondda riots) were a series of violent confrontations between the striking coal miners and police that took place at various locations in and around the Rhondda mines of the Cambrian Combine, a cartel of mining companies formed to regulate prices and wages in South Wales.

The disturbances and the confrontations were the culmination of the industrial dispute between workers and the mine owners. The term "Tonypandy riot" initially applied to specific events on the evening of Tuesday, 8 November 1910, when strikers smashed windows of businesses in Tonypandy. There was hand-to-hand fighting between the strikers and the Glamorgan Constabulary, which was reinforced by the Bristol Constabulary.

Home Secretary Winston Churchill's decision to allow the British Army to be sent to the area to reinforce the police shortly after 8 November riot caused much ill feeling towards him in South Wales. His responsibility remains a strongly disputed topic.

Background 
The conflict arose when the Naval Colliery Company opened a new coal seam at the Ely Pit in Penygraig. After a short test period to determine what would be the future rate of extraction, owners claimed that the miners deliberately worked more slowly than possible. The roughly-70 miners at the seam argued that the new seam was more difficult to work than others because of a stone band that ran through it. 

On 1 September 1910, the owners posted a lock-out notice at the mine that closed the site to all 950 workers, not just the 70 at the newly-opened Bute seam. The Ely Pit miners reacted by going on strike. The Cambrian Combine then called in strikebreakers from outside the area to which the miners responded by picketing the work site. On 1 November, the miners of the South Wales coalfield were balloted for strike action by the South Wales Miners' Federation, resulting in the 12,000 men working for the mines owned by the Cambrian Combine going on strike. A conciliation board was formed to reach an agreement, with William Abraham acting on behalf of the miners and F. L. Davis for the owners. Although an agreed wage of 2s 3d per ton was arrived at, the Cambrian Combine workmen rejected the agreement.

On 2 November, the authorities in South Wales were enquiring about the procedure for requesting military aid in the event of disturbances caused by the striking miners. The Glamorgan Constabulary's resources were stretched, as in addition to the Cambrian Combine dispute, there was a month-old strike in the neighbouring Cynon Valley, and the Chief Constable of Glamorgan had by Sunday, 6 November, assembled 200 imported police in the Tonypandy area.

Riots at Tonypandy 
By this time, strikers had successfully shut down all local pits, except Llwynypia colliery. On 6 November, miners became aware of the owners' intention to deploy strikebreakers to keep pumps and ventilation going at the Glamorgan Colliery in Llwynypia. On Monday, 7 November, strikers surrounded and picketed the Glamorgan Colliery to prevent such workers from entering. That resulted in sharp skirmishes with police officers posted inside the site. Although miners' leaders called for calm, a small group of strikers began stoning the pump-house. A portion of the wooden fence surrounding the site was torn down. Hand-to-hand fighting ensued between miners and police. After repeated baton charges, police drove strikers back towards Tonypandy Square, just after midnight. Between 1 am and 2 am on 8 November, a demonstration at Tonypandy Square was dispersed by Cardiff Police, using truncheons, resulting in casualties on both sides. That led Glamorgan's chief constable, Lionel Lindsay, supported by the general manager of the Cambrian Combine, to request military support from the War Office.

Home Secretary Winston Churchill learned of that development and, after discussions with the War Office, delayed action on the request. Churchill felt that the local authorities were overreacting and believed that the Liberal government could calm matters down. He instead despatched Metropolitan Police officers, both on foot and mounted, and sent some cavalry troops to Cardiff. He did not specifically deploy cavalry but authorised their use by civil authorities if it was deemed necessary. Churchill's personal message to strikers was, "We are holding back the soldiers for the present and sending only police". Despite that assurance, the local stipendiary magistrate sent a telegram to London later that day and requested military support, which the Home Office authorised. Troops were deployed after the skirmish at the Glamorgan Colliery on 7 November but before rioting on the evening of 8 November.

During the evening of rioting, properties in Tonypandy were damaged, and some looting took place. Shops were smashed systematically but not indiscriminately. There was little looting, but some rioters wore clothes taken from the shops and paraded in a festival atmosphere. Women and children were involved in considerable numbers, as they had been outside the Glamorgan colliery. No police were seen at the town square until the Metropolitan Police arrived around 10:30 pm, almost three hours after the rioting began, when the disturbance subsided of its own accord. A few shops remained untouched, notably that of the chemist Willie Llewellyn, which was rumoured to have been spared because he had been a famous Welsh international rugby footballer.

A small police presence might have deterred window-breakages, but police had been moved from the streets to protect the residences of mine owners and managers. 

At 1:20 am on 9 November, orders were sent to Colonel Currey at Cardiff to despatch a squadron of the 18th Hussars to reach Pontypridd at 8:15 am. Upon arrival, one contingent patrolled Aberaman and another was sent to Llwynypia, where it patrolled all day. Returning to Pontypridd at night, the troops arrived at Porth as a disturbance was breaking out, and the maintained order until the arrival of the Metropolitan Police.
Although no authentic record exists of casualties since many miners would have refused treatment for fear of prosecution for their part in the riots, nearly 80 police and over 500 citizens were injured. One miner, Samuel Rhys, died of head injuries that were said to have been inflicted by a policeman's baton, but the verdict of the coroner's jury was cautious: "We agree that Samuel Rhys died from injuries he received on 8 November caused by some blunt instrument. The evidence is not sufficiently clear to us how he received those injuries." Similarly, the medical evidence concluded, "The fracture had been caused by a blunt instrument—it might have been caused by a policeman's truncheon or by two of the several weapons used by the strikers, which were produced in court."    Authorities had reinforced the town with 400 policemen, one company of the Lancashire Fusiliers, billeted at Llwynypia, and the squadron of the 18th Hussars.

Thirteen miners from Gilfach Goch were arrested and prosecuted for their part in the unrest. The trial of the thirteen occupied six days in December.  During the trial, they were supported by marches and demonstrations by up to 10,000 men, who were refused entry to the town. Custodial terms of two to six weeks were issued to some of the respondents; others were discharged or fined.

Reaction to riots 
Purported eyewitness accounts of alleged shootings persisted and were relayed by word of mouth. In some instances, it was said that there were many shots and fatalities. There are no records of any shots being fired by troops. The only recorded death was Samuel Rhys. In the autobiographical "documentary novel" Cwmardy, the later  communist trade union organiser Lewis Jones presents a stylistically-romantic but closely-detailed, account of the riots and their agonising domestic and social consequences. The account was criticised for its creative approach to truth. For example, in the chapter "Soldiers are sent to the Valley", he narrates an incident in which eleven strikers are killed by two volleys of rifle fire in the town square after which the miners adopt a grimly-retaliatory stance. In that account, the end of the strike is hastened by organised terror directed at mine managers, leading to introduction of a minimum-wage act by the government that is hailed as a victory by the strikers. The accuracy of the account is disputed.  

A more official version states, "The strike finally ended in August 1911, with the workers forced to accept the 2s 3d per ton negotiated by William Abraham MP prior to the strike... the workers actually returning to work on the first Monday in September", ten months after the strike began and twelve months after the lock-out that had started the confrontation.

Criticism of Churchill 

Churchill's role in the events at Tonypandy during the conflict left anger towards him in South Wales that still persists today. The main point of contention was his decision to allow troops to be sent to Wales. Although this was an unusual move and was seen by those in Wales as an overreaction, his Tory opponents suggested that he should have acted with greater vigour. The troops acted more circumspectly and were commanded with more common sense than the police, whose role under Lionel Lindsay was, in the words of historian David Smith, "more like an army of occupation".

The incident continued to haunt Churchill throughout his career. Such was the strength of feeling, that almost forty years later, when speaking in Cardiff during the General Election campaign of 1950, this time as Conservative Party leader, Churchill was forced to address the issue, stating: "When I was Home Secretary in 1910, I had a great horror and fear of having to become responsible for the military firing on a crowd of rioters and strikers. Also, I was always in sympathy with the miners..."  

A major factor in the dislike of Churchill's use of the military was not in any action undertaken by the troops, but the fact that their presence prevented any strike action which might have ended the strike early in the miners' favour. The troops also ensured that trials of rioters, strikers and miners' leaders would take place and be successfully prosecuted in Pontypridd in 1911. The defeat of the miners in 1911 was, in the eyes of much of the local community, a direct consequence of state intervention without any negotiation; that the strikers were breaking the law was not a factor with many locals. This result was seen as a direct result of Churchill's actions.

Political fallout for Churchill also continued. In 1940, when Neville Chamberlain's war-time government was faltering, Clement Attlee secretly warned that the Labour Party might not follow Churchill because of his association with Tonypandy. There was uproar in the House of Commons in 1978 when Churchill's grandson, also named Winston Churchill, was replying to a routine question on miners' pay; he was warned by the Labour leader James Callaghan not to pursue "the vendetta of your family against the miners of Tonypandy". In 2010, ninety-nine years after the riots, a Welsh local council made objections to an old military base being named after Churchill in the Vale of Glamorgan because of his sending troops into the Rhondda Valley.

Historical myth

The Tonypandy riots are subject of a popular historical myth that troops fired on the miners. Josephine Tey refers to this in her novel The Daughter of Time, and coined the term "tonypandy" to refer to "when a historical event is reported and memorialized inaccurately but consistently until the resulting fiction is believed to be the truth."

See also 

 Llanelli railway strike, 1911
 National coal strike of 1912

References

Further reading 
  
 O'Brien, Anthony Mòr. "Churchill and the Tonypandy Riots," Welsh History Review (1994), 17#1 pp 67-99.

External links 
 Rhondda—the story of coal pp. 124–126 of 126-page download at Rhondda Cynon Taf Library Service (37mB)
 Carradice, Phil The Tonypandy Riots of 1910 at BBC Wales History, 3 November 2010
 History of the Cambrian Combine miners' strike and Tonypandy Riots
 The Rhondda Riots of 1910–1911 on website of South Wales Police
 Tonypandy 1910 Coalfield web materials from the University of Wales, Swansea, with further reading and external links
 Cambrian Colliery, Clydach Vale. c. 1910 on Welsh Coalmines historical website
 Commemorating the 100th Anniversary A heritage page of Rhondda Cynon Taf Council
 Cambrian Combine miners strike and Tonypandy riot, 1910 - Sam Lowry – A brief history of the background to the dispute, the strike and its outcome
 Did Churchill Send Troops Against Strikers? "Guilty with an Explanation" Churchill's decisions to use troops against strikers prior to WW1
 The towns in Wales where Churchill was loathed How Churchill's reputation was still tarnished 50 years after Tonypandy

1910 in Wales
1911 in Wales
1910 riots
Labour disputes in Wales
Mining in Wales
Miners' labour disputes in the United Kingdom
Riots and civil disorder in Wales
1911 riots
Winston Churchill
Coal in Wales
1911 labor disputes and strikes